Elin or Elín is a variation of Ellen and Helene used in Scandinavian and Celtic languages.

Prominent people
Elin Andersdotter (d. 1569), Swedish lady-in-waiting and political conspirator
Elin Brandell (1882–1963), Swedish journalist 
Elín Ebba Gunnarsdóttir (born 1953), Icelandic writer
Elin Fflur (born 1984), Welsh singer-songwriter
Elin Gustafsson (born 1989), Swedish politician
Elin Gustavsdotter (Sture) (died 1495), Swedish noble, consort of the regent Erik Axelsson
Elin i Horsnäs (died after September 1611), alleged Swedish witch
Elin Hilderbrand, American romance writer
Elín Hirst, Icelandic Member of Parliament
Elin Holmlöv, Swedish ice hockey player
Elin Jones (born 1966), Welsh politician
Elin Kallio (1859–1927), pioneering Finnish gymnast
Elin Kristiansen (born 1968), Norwegian biathlete
Elin Kvande (born 1951), Norwegian sociologist and gender researcher
Elin Lanto (born 1984), Swedish singer
 Elin Lindqvist (born 1982), Swedish novelist
Elin Manahan Thomas (born 1977), Welsh soprano singer
Elin Nilsen (born 1968), Norwegian cross country skier
Elin Nordegren (born 1980), Swedish model and ex-wife of golfer Tiger Woods
Elin Pelin (1877–1949), Bulgarian writer
Elin Segerlind (born 1985), Swedish politician
Elin Sigvardsson (born 1981), Swedish singer-songwriter
Elin Topuzakov (born 1977), Bulgarian footballer
Elin Wägner (1882–1949), Swedish writer, journalist, feminist, teacher, ecologist and pacifist
Helena (wife of Inge the Elder) or Elin (died 1105), Swedish queen consort
Helena of Skövde (c. 1101–1160), local Swedish Catholic saint

References

Swedish feminine given names
Scandinavian feminine given names